Dhannupur is a village in jaunpur, Uttar Pradesh, India.

References

Villages in Jaunpur district